The 2015 North Devon District Council election took place on 7 May 2015 to elect members of North Devon District Council in England. This was on the same day as other local elections. The whole council was up for election and remained in no overall control.

Background
Before the election the council had no majority party, with the Conservatives having 18 councillors, 14 Liberal Democrats and 11 Independents.

There were 149 candidates standing in the election for the 43 seats on the council (up from 120 in 2011). These were made up of 41 Conservatives, 37 Green Party, 28 Liberal Democrats, 20 Independents, 9 Labour, 8 United Kingdom Independence Party (UKIP), 4 Trade Unionist and Socialist Coalition and 2 Communist Party of Britain. The candidates included the former Liberal Democrat leader of the council, Malcolm Prowse, and Yvette Gubb, who both quit the Liberal Democrats to stand as independents in the election, and Jeremy Yabsley who quit the Conservatives to also run as an independent. Unlike in previous years, no ward contest went unopposed.

Election Result

Ward Results

By-elections

References

2015 English local elections
May 2015 events in the United Kingdom
2015
2010s in Devon